is a railway station of Hanshin Main Line, in Nada-ku, Kobe, Hyōgo Prefecture, Japan, between Nishi-Nada Station and Kasuganomichi Station.

Overview

Layout
There are a side platform and an island platform serving a track each in a trench.

Surroundings
The station is located near Nada Station of JR Kōbe Line (Tōkaidō Main Line) and is an entrance to Hyogo Prefectural Museum of Art, Hyogo International Center of JICA, WHO Centre for Health Development and Disaster Reduction and Human Renovation Institution.

History 
Iwaya Station opened on the Hanshin Main Line on 12 April 1905.

The tracks to the west of the station were moved underground in 1934.

Service was suspended owing to the Great Hanshin earthquake in January 1995. Restoration work on the Hanshin Main Line took 7 months to complete.

Station numbering was introduced on 21 December 2013, with Kasuganomichi being designated as station number HS-31.

Gallery

References

External links 

 Station website (in Japanese)

Railway stations in Japan opened in 1905
Railway stations in Hyōgo Prefecture
Hanshin Main Line